Maria Catharina Ida (Marieke) van der Werf (born 8 November 1959 in Dordrecht) is a former Dutch politician. As a member of the Christian Democratic Appeal (Christen-Democratisch Appèl) she was an MP from 11 January 2011 to 19 September 2012. She focused on matters of sustainable development and cultural policy.

Electoral history

References 
  Parlement.com biography

1959 births
Living people
21st-century Dutch politicians
21st-century Dutch women politicians
Christian Democratic Appeal politicians
Members of the House of Representatives (Netherlands)
Municipal councillors of Amsterdam
People from Dordrecht